Harvey Thomas Moore (November 9, 1809 – April 24, 1878) was an American farmer and politician.

Born in Barnet, Vermont, Harvey served in the Vermont House of Representatives, from Danville, Caledonia County, Vermont in 1849 and 1850. In 1854, Moore served as county judge of Caledonia County, Vermont. In 1857, Moore moved to Brodhead, Wisconsin and was a farmer. In 1862, he served in the Wisconsin State Assembly as a War Democrat. Then, in 1874 and 1875, Moore served in the Wisconsin State Senate and was elected on the Reform Party ticket. He served as vice president of the Sugar River Valley Railroad Company and as one of the directors of the Madison, Portage & Lake Superior Railway. Moore died in Brodhead, Wisconsin.

Notes

1809 births
1878 deaths
People from Barnet, Vermont
People from Danville, Vermont
People from Brodhead, Wisconsin
Businesspeople from Wisconsin
Farmers from Wisconsin
Wisconsin Reformers (19th century)
19th-century American politicians
Vermont state court judges
Members of the Vermont House of Representatives
Democratic Party Wisconsin state senators
19th-century American judges
Democratic Party members of the Wisconsin State Assembly